The year 1932 in architecture involved some significant events.

Events
 International Style by Philip Johnson and Henry-Russell Hitchcock is published.
 The International Exhibition of Modern Architecture at the Museum of Modern Art in New York spreads the International Style.
 John Wiley & Sons publishes Architectural Graphic Standards by Charles George Ramsey (1884–1963) and Harold Reeve Sleeper, the first book to present the accepted architectural practices of the time in a clear and accessible graphic form.

Buildings and structures

Buildings opened

 March 19 – Sydney Harbour Bridge, designed by John Bradfield (engineer), is opened in Sydney, Australia.
 April 23 – New Shakespeare Memorial Theatre at Stratford-upon-Avon, designed by Elisabeth Scott, is opened, becoming the first important work erected in the United Kingdom by a woman architect.
 July 19 – Lambeth Bridge, London, designed by engineer Sir George Humphreys and architects Sir Reginald Blomfield and G. Topham Forrest.
 August 1 – Thiepval Memorial, designed by Sir Edwin Lutyens, is inaugurated in the Somme (France).
 August 7 – Douaumont ossuary, designed by Léon Azéma to house the bones of at least 130,000 unidentified soldiers of both sides who died in the Battle of Verdun.
 September 19 – Arnos Grove tube station, London, designed by Charles Holden.
 September 22 – Sheffield City Hall, Yorkshire, England, designed by Vincent Harris in 1920.
 November 16 – Parliament Buildings (Northern Ireland), Belfast, designed by Sir Arnold Thornely.
 November 25 – Saint Sophia Cathedral in Harbin, China.
 November 27 – Bixby Creek Bridge at Big Sur, California, designed by C. H. Purcell and F. W. Panhorst.

Other new buildings
 PSFS Building in Center City, Philadelphia, designed by George Howe and William Lescaze, first International Style skyscraper in the United States.
 Leopoldine-Glöckel-yard (residence), Vienna, Austria, designed by Josef Frank.
 High Cross House, Dartington Hall, Devon, England, designed by William Lescaze.
 Deneke Building at Lady Margaret Hall, Oxford, England, designed by Giles Gilbert Scott.
 Alameda Theatre (Alameda, California), United States, designed by Timothy L. Pflueger.
 Church of the Most Sacred Heart of Our Lord in Prague, designed by Jože Plečnik.
 Catholic Church of St Engelbert, Cologne, Germany, designed by Dominikus Böhm.
 The Daily Express Building, London, designed by Sir Owen Williams.
 The Hoover Building on the Western Avenue in Perivale, West London, designed by Wallis, Gilbert and Partners in Art Deco style.
 Maison de Verre, Paris, France, by Pierre Chareau, Bernard Bijvoet and Louis Dalbet.
 Paimio Sanatorium in Finland, designed by Alvar Aalto.
 Unilever House in the City of London, designed by James Lomax-Simpson of Unilever with Sir John Burnet and Thomas S. Tait of Sir John Burnet and Partners.
 Immeuble Clarté apartment building in Geneva, designed by Le Corbusier and his cousin, Pierre Jeanneret.
 Narkomfin building (collective apartments) in Moscow, designed by Moisei Ginzburg with Ignaty Milinis in 1928.
 Harnischmacher House in Wiesbaden, Germany, designed by Marcel Breuer.
 Wohnbedarf furniture stores in Switzerland, designed by Marcel Breuer.
 Zollverein Coal Mine Industrial Complex, Shaft 12, Schacht Albert Vögler, Germany, designed by Fritz Schupp and Martin Kremmer.
 Sol Wurtzel House, Bel Air, Los Angeles, designed by Wallace Neff.

Awards
 Olympic gold medal – Gustave Saacké, Pierre Bailey and Pierre Montenot for Arena for bulls, Paris.
 Olympic silver medal – John Russell Pope of the United States for Design for Payne Whitney Gymnasium.
 Olympic bronze medal – Richard Konwiartz of Germany for Design for Schlesierkampfbahn, Breslau.
 RIBA Royal Gold Medal – Hendrik Petrus Berlage.
 Grand Prix de Rome, architecture – Camille Montagné.

Births
 June 22 – Anthony Hunt, English structural engineer (died 2022)
 July 6 – Herman Hertzberger, Dutch architect and academic
 July 19 – William S. W. Lim, Singaporean architect (died 2023)
 August 11 – Peter Eisenman, American architect
 September 9 – Carm Lino Spiteri, Maltese architect and politician (died 2008)

Deaths
 April 17 – Sir Patrick Geddes, Scottish urban theorist (born 1854)
 August 19 – E. S. Prior, English Arts and crafts movement architect and theorist (born 1852)
 November – Abraham E. Lefcourt, American real estate developer (born 1876)
 December 8 – Gertrude Jekyll, English garden designer (born 1843)
 December 28 – Léon Jaussely, French architect and urban planner (born 1857)

References